The Springfield Lasers are a World TeamTennis franchise.  The franchise was purchased and donated to the city of Springfield, Missouri by the Cooper family in 1996.  They play their home matches at Mediacom Stadium at Cooper Tennis Complex.

History
The team advanced to the league final in 1999, 2001, 2009, 2013, 2014, 2018 and 2019, and only in the last 2 years have they won the championship. In 2010, the Lasers had the best regular season record (10–4) in World TeamTennis and advanced to the WTT Western Conference Championship but lost to the Kansas City Explorers, 20 to 17.  The Lasers faced the Philadelphia Freedoms in the 2018 WTT Championship match on August 5, 2018.  The Lasers defeated the Freedoms 19-18 for their first WTT Championship in team history.

In 2015, the Lasers made slight modifications to their team logo. The words "Springfield" and "tennis" were also relocated. Affair purple was replaced with kingfisher daisy, a deeper shade of purple. Pacific blue was also replaced with deep sky blue. At the same time, the Lasers began using an alternate logo with the same design but a different color scheme. In place of kingfisher daisy was Han violet-blue, and bright turquoise appears where deep sky blue is seen in the main logo.

Current roster
 John-Laffnie de Jager, head coach
 Hayley Carter
 Olga Govortsova
 Mitchell Krueger
 Robert Lindstedt
 Caty McNally
 Jean-Julien Rojer
As of April 6, 2021

References

External links
 Official team website

World TeamTennis teams
Tennis teams in Missouri
Sports clubs established in 1996
1996 establishments in Missouri
Sports in Springfield, Missouri